"Crew Love" is a song by Canadian rapper Drake from his second studio album Take Care (2011). The song features guest vocals from Canadian singer the Weeknd. Production was provided by The Weeknd as his debut single, Noah "40" Shebib and Illangelo. "Crew Love" was released as the album's seventh single in the United Kingdom on July 30, 2012.

Critical reception
Jon Dolan of Rolling Stone described the track as "avant-R&B lushness" and "a tender ode to metaphorical family in the face of a world where everybody wants a little Drake."

Chart performance
"Crew Love" debuted at number 200 on the UK Singles Chart for the chart week of July 14, 2012. It entered the top 100 of the chart two weeks later at number 64, later peaking at number 37. The track also became a top ten hit on the UK R&B Chart, where it peaked at number seven.

Despite the absence of a proper single release in the United States, "Crew Love" managed to chart on several Billboard singles charts owing to strong rhythmic and urban contemporary radio airplay. It peaked at number nine on the Hot R&B/Hip-Hop Songs chart in June 2012, becoming Drake's twenty-fourth top ten single on the chart. The song also peaked at number 14 on the Hot Rap Songs chart and at number 80 on both the main Hot 100 singles chart (which was his lowest peak as a lead artist) and the Canadian Hot 100.

Charts

Certifications

Release history

References

External links
 

2012 singles
Drake (musician) songs
The Weeknd songs
Songs written by Drake (musician)
Song recordings produced by Illangelo
Song recordings produced by 40 (record producer)
Songs written by 40 (record producer)
2011 songs
Universal Records singles
Cash Money Records singles
Songs written by the Weeknd
Songs written by Illangelo
Song recordings produced by the Weeknd
Songs written by Anthony Palman